During the 1973–74 English football season, Leicester City F.C. competed in the Football League First Division.

Season summary
The 1973–74 season was a solid one for Leicester, starting the league well going eight matches unbeaten. There was also some entrancing entertainment served up but too many draws prevented the Foxes from challenging for a UEFA Cup place and had to settle for a creditable 9th place finish. Their main highlight was the FA Cup by reaching their sixth semi-final in their history, to set up an ensuing tie with favourites Liverpool. They held the Reds to a 0-0 draw at Old Trafford with a solid defensive display to set up an interesting replay at Villa Park but despite equalising through Len Glover after being 1-0 down, it ended in disappointment as the Foxes suffered a 3-1 defeat.

Final league table

Results
Leicester City's score comes first

Legend

Football League First Division

FA Cup

FA Cup third place play-off

League Cup

Texaco Cup

Squad

References

Leicester City F.C. seasons
Leicester City